World Junior Hot Air Ballooning Championships is main ballooning championships in the World for juniors. Organized by Fédération Aéronautique Internationale.

Championships

All-time medal table
Updated after 2021 Championships.

References 

Ballooning competitions
Recurring sporting events established in 2012